Maiwa is an Austronesian language spoken by around 50,000 people in South Sulawesi, Indonesia. It belongs to the Northern branch of the South Sulawesi subgroup, and is closely related to Duri, Enrekang and Malimpung.

References

South Sulawesi
Languages of Sulawesi
South Sulawesi languages